Padre Kilian Kirchhoff OFM (given name: Josef Kirchhoff; born 18 December 1892 in Rönkhausen; executed 24 April 1944 in Brandenburg-Görden Prison) was a Catholic priest, translator and dissident. He was executed by the Third Reich for critical remarks.

Kirchhoff was arrested by the Gestapo on October 21, 1943 for expressions critical of the regime . In the subsequent trial, the witness justified the denunciation with her hatred of priests, "because they were opponents of National Socialism". Roland Freisler sentenced Kirchhoff to death on March 7, 1944 at the People's Court in Berlin. Kirchhoff himself submitted written requests for clemency, set up and promoted by Anton Baumstark, along with a group of theologians and orientalists from various universities. After the war, the intercession of the Apostolic Nuncio Cesare Orsenigo, the head of the Episcopal Commissariat of the Fulda Bishops' Conference in Berlin, Heinrich Wienken, and the Paderborn Bishop Lorenz Jaeger can be heard. Nonetheless, Kirchhoff's death sentence was carried out on April 24, 1944 in Brandenburg-Görden by beheading. The urn with Kirchhoff's ashes was buried on April 1, 1950 in the crypt of the Werl Franciscan monastery at Werl park cemetery.

Publications 
 Licht vom Licht: Hymnen / Symeon der Neue Theologe
 Die Ostkirche betet
 Der Osterjubel der Ostkirche
 Hymnen der Ostkirche

Further reading
Engelbert Kutzner, Art.: Pater Kilian (Joseph) Kirchhoff. In: Helmut Moll (ed.): Zeugen für Christus. Das deutsche Martyrologium des 20. Jahrhunderts Paderborn 1999, 7th ed. 2019, vol. 1, pp. 914–918
Johannes Madey, Ottokar Mund: Kirchhoff, Kilian. In: Biographisch-Bibliographisches Kirchenlexikon (BBKL). Band 3, Bautz, Herzberg 1992, Sp. 1518–1519.
Ottokar Mund: Kilian Kirchhoff: Glaubenszeuge, Brückenbauer zwischen Ost und West. 2. Auflage. Dietrich-Coelde-Verlag, Werl 1983, 
 Rainer Asshauer: Seine Überzeugung kostete ihn das Leben. Westdeutsche Allgemeine Zeitung, 21. April 2014

1892 births
1944 deaths
People from Olpe (district)
People from North Rhine-Westphalia executed by Nazi Germany
Executed Roman Catholic priests
20th-century German Roman Catholic priests